Aderet can refer to:

Aderet, Israel, moshav in central Israel
Yeshivat Aderet Eliyahu, Haredi, Lithuanian yeshiva
Aderet (singer), Israeli entertainer
Eliyahu David Rabinowitz-Teomim (1845–1905), also known by his acronym ADeReT, Lithuanian rabbi
Shlomo ben Aderet (1235–1310), Medieval rabbi, halakhist, and Talmudist